Zaidan may refer to:
 Zayd (name)
 Zahedan, a city in Iran
 Zaidan, Khuzestan, a village in Iran
 Abdallah Elias Zaidan, Maronite bishop in the United States

See also
 Zeydan (disambiguation)
 Zeydun (disambiguation)